Celebrity Circus was an Australian reality television series which aired in May 2005 on the Nine Network. The show took celebrities and, with the help of Silvers Circus, trained them into circus acts. In the final show, the celebrities performed in front of a live crowd and showcased what they had learned. It was shown over five one-hour episodes and was hosted by Bud Tingwell. The various skills in the show were high-wire, flying trapeze, knife throwing, fire juggling and clowning. Some of the performers were also trained in two events called the Human Cannon and the Wheel of Death.

The participants were: actors Cameron Daddo and Kimberley Davies; former Home and Away star Dieter Brummer; Celebrity Big Brother winner Dylan Lewis; Australia's Funniest Home Video Show host Toni Pearen; Vadim Dale (from Outback Jack) and his fiancé, Natalie Franzman; Olympic beach volleyball gold medallist Kerri Pottharst; and Ricki-Lee Coulter from Australian Idol. The first episode, which aired on 1 May, was placed in the top ten of the ratings for that week.

The series appeared in the Portugal on TVI in 2006 as Circo das Celebridades. On 11 June 2008 an American version began airing on NBC.

International versions

 Currently airing franchise
 Franchise no longer in production

References

2000s Australian reality television series
Nine Network original programming
2005 Australian television series debuts
2005 Australian television series endings
Circus television shows
Television shows set in Melbourne